Darcy DiNucci is an author, web designer and expert in user experience. DiNucci coined the term Web 2.0 in 1999 and predicted the influence it would have on public relations.

Career
DiNucci has worked in web design and user experience in a number of companies including Ammunition, Method, Adaptive Path, Sequence, and Smart Design.

In 1999, DiNucci introduced the concept of Web 2.0 and anticipated the influence it would likely have on public relations in an article in Print Magazine.

Works

See also
 History of the Internet
 History of the World Wide Web
 Tim Berners Lee
 Web 2.0 Summit

References

External links

Human–computer interaction
User interfaces
Web designers
Web 2.0
Possibly living people
Year of birth missing (living people)
Place of birth missing (living people)